Oligodon nagao is a species of snakes in the family Colubridae. Specimens have been collected from Lang Son and Cao Bang in northern Vietnam, Guangxi Autonomous Region in southern People's Republic of China, and from Khammouane Province in central Laos PDR.

Description
It has 15 or 17 dorsal scale rows at its mid-body, a short tail which can be up to 107 mm and a body up to 680 mm in length.

Distribution 
Vietnam, Laos, China.

References

nagao
Snakes of Asia
Snakes of China
Reptiles of Laos
Snakes of Vietnam
Reptiles described in 2012